Ramongo is a department or commune of Boulkiemdé Province in central Burkina Faso. As of 2005 it has a population of 28,326. Its capital lies at the town of Ramongo.

Towns and villages
RamongoBayandi NabyiriBayandi PalogoBayandi TanguinBouloum NabyiriKabinouKamsiKolonkandéKoukinkuilgaRamongo-TanguinRamonkodogo
Salbisgo-DapoyaSalgisgo-ItaoréYagoam

References

Departments of Burkina Faso
Boulkiemdé Province